Nicholas Channing DiGiovanni (born May 19, 1996) is an American celebrity chef, internet personality, and entertainer. As of March 2023, DiGiovanni has over 25 million followers across his social media accounts, including YouTube, Twitter, and Instagram.

He is one of the youngest ever finalists on MasterChef, placing third when he competed at 22 years old.

Early life
DiGiovanni was born on May 19, 1996 in Providence, Rhode Island to Chris and Susan DiGiovanni (née Naimi). He is of Italian, German, English and Persian descent. He is the oldest of four brothers. He developed a passion for food at a young age by watching his grandmother and great-grandmother cook meals for the family.

Education

DiGiovanni attended high school at Milton Academy, where he graduated cum laude. He served as co-head of the Milton Academy Community Service program.

After graduating from high school, DiGiovanni went to Harvard University. At Harvard, DiGiovanni created his own concentration called "Food and Climate". As part of his coursework, he attended lectures taught by Massimo Bottura, Grant Achatz and José Andrés.

For his senior thesis, DiGiovanni analyzed data on carbon emissions in 36 global restaurants from Singapore to San Francisco. His thesis was advised by American author and journalist Michael Pollan.

DiGiovanni got accepted to attend Harvard Business School through the 2+2 deferral program. In January 2023, he announced he was moving on from that dream and let Harvard know he was not planning to matriculate.

Career

Television 

During his senior year of college, DiGiovanni attended a casting call for season 10 of MasterChef. He was selected to compete on the show and finished in third place. To film the show, DiGiovanni reportedly left in the middle of the term at Harvard without informing his professors. He returned the next season as a mentor for finalists.

Social media 
After completing MasterChef and graduating from Harvard, DiGiovanni began to post cooking videos on YouTube. In his first-ever YouTube video, DiGiovanni cooked the dessert he would have made in the MasterChef finale, which has over 2.9 million views as of March 2022. He then began to regularly post videos of him cooking different foods. His YouTube channel has over 8.7 million subscribers as of February 2023.

DiGiovanni has partnered with brands including Instacart and Kinder Bueno.

Philanthropy 
DiGiovanni is the Lead Ambassador for The Farmlink Project. Additionally, in 2021, DiGiovanni participated in the #TeamSeas campaign founded by YouTuber MrBeast, which raised $30 million to clean up 30 million pounds of trash in the ocean.

Accolades 
DiGiovanni has been featured in several publications, including Today, Good Morning America, and Harper's Bazaar. DiGiovanni was named to the Forbes 30 Under 30 list for Food and Drink. In 2021, DiGiovanni won YouTube's Streamy Award for Food, an award recognizing the world's top food creator of the year. He was a Webby Award recipient in 2022.

In November 2021, DiGiovanni broke the Guinness World Record for the largest ever cake pop, which weighed 97 pounds and 8.52 ounces. 

In June 2022, he broke another Guinness World Record for the largest ever chicken nugget, which weighed 20.96 kilograms. In August, he visited the most fast food restaurants in 24 hours (69 restaurants).  In October, he beat Gordon Ramsay's record for the fastest time to fillet a 10 lb fish by 5 seconds; completing it in 1 minute exactly.  On the same day he constructed the world's largest sushi roll, which measured at 2.15 meters in diameter.   In November, he created the largest fortune cookie at 1.47 kilograms  and made the largest donation of turkey in 24 hours (64,463.44 kg - roughly 7,620 turkeys).

Filmography & Bibliography

Filmography

Bibliography

References

External links
 
 
 YouTube channel

American TikTokers
American YouTubers
1996 births
Living people
Milton Academy alumni
Harvard University alumni
People from Providence, Rhode Island
American television chefs
Chefs from Massachusetts
American people of Italian descent
American people of Iranian descent
American male sailors (sport)
Harvard Crimson athletes
Harvard Crimson sailing
Guinness World Records
Streamy Award winners
Chefs from Rhode Island